Line 3 of the Bilbao metro is a rapid transit line in Biscay, Basque Country, Spain.

Unlike the two other lines of the system (which are operated by Metro Bilbao S.A.), line 3 is operated by Euskotren, which runs it as part of the Euskotren Trena network. Trains from the Bilbao-San Sebastián, Txorierri and Urdaibai lines of the network run through line 3.

Operations 
Trains run every 7.5 minutes on weekdays, and every 10 minutes on weekends. As the line is part of the wider Euskotren Trena commuter/interurban railway network, most trains on the line continue beyond the termini of Matiko and Kukullaga.

Station list

Rolling stock 

The line shares rolling stock with the rest of the Euskotren Trena network. Currently, 900 and 950 series trains are used.

References

External links 

 
 Metro Bilbao
 

03
Euskotren
Transport in Bilbao
Railway lines opened in 2017
Metre gauge railways in Spain
2017 establishments in the Basque Country (autonomous community)
1500 V DC railway electrification